Christopher Grey Ruegamer [ROO-gah-mer] (born June 1, 1976) is a former American football center who is the director of player engagement for the Green Bay Packers of the National Football League (NFL). He played college football at Arizona State and was drafted by the Miami Dolphins in the third round of the 1999 NFL Draft.

Ruegamer has also been a member of the Pittsburgh Steelers, New England Patriots, Green Bay Packers, New York Giants and Seattle Seahawks. He has earned two Super Bowl rings in his career, with the Patriots in Super Bowl XXXVI and with the Giants in Super Bowl XLII.

Early years
Ruegamer attended Bishop Gorman High School in Las Vegas, Nevada and won three varsity letters each in football and track and field and twice in wrestling.

College career
Ruegamer played college football at Arizona State University, where he was a four-year starter.  Ruegamer played for the Sun Devils in the 1997 Rose Bowl.

Professional career

Miami Dolphins
Ruegamer was originally drafted by the Miami Dolphins in the third round of the 1999 NFL Draft. He did not appear in a game his rookie season. The Dolphins waived Ruegamer on August 26, 2000.

Pittsburgh Steelers
Ruegamer was signed to the practice squad of the Pittsburgh Steelers on August 29, 2000. He remained there until being signed by the New England Patriots on November 16.

New England Patriots
Ruegamer played for the New England Patriots from 2000 to 2002, and appeared in the team's Super Bowl XXXVI victory over St. Louis Rams in 2001.

Green Bay Packers
Ruegamer played for the Green Bay Packers from 2003 to 2005. He started 11 games for the Green Bay Packers in 2004 on a line that set single-season team records for fewest sacks allowed (14), first downs (354), net yards (6,357), and net passing yards (4,449).

New York Giants
Ruegamer signed with the New York Giants in 2006 and played three seasons with the team. He appeared in New York's Super Bowl XLII victory over the New England Patriots.

Seattle Seahawks
Ruegamer was signed by the Seattle Seahawks on July 31, 2009. He was released on August 25 when the team claimed center Brian De La Puente off waivers.

Personal
Ruegamer's Uncle Bob played with the University of Minnesota in the 1961 and 1962 Rose Bowls.

Ruegamer has a Basque family friend and has helped the friend castrate lamb with his teeth.

Ruegamer is a prankster and is also known for showing up to Friday practices in costume.  He keeps all his toenail clippings and callous shavings in a cup all season long.  If anyone messes with him and he deems it necessary, he will dump the cup in personal belongings of theirs.

True to his name, Ruegamer may be the only active NFL player with predominantly grey hair. Ruegamer has a nephew named Andrew who currently trains at SBGI in Whitefish, Montana.

References

External links
New England Patriots bio
New York Giants bio
Seattle Seahawks bio

1976 births
Living people
Players of American football from Scottsdale, Arizona
Players of American football from Nevada
American football offensive guards
American football centers
Arizona State Sun Devils football players
Miami Dolphins players
Pittsburgh Steelers players
New England Patriots players
Green Bay Packers players
New York Giants players
Seattle Seahawks players
People from the Las Vegas Valley
Bishop Gorman High School alumni